Tommy Donaldson (16 July 1933 in Vicker, Virginia – January 26, 2007 in Nashville, Tennessee), better known as Tommy Dee, was an American country singer, best known for recording "Three Stars" in 1959.

Career
He started out as a disc jockey, who became a musician. After his success with "Three Stars", he still recorded for different record labels throughout the 1960s, with little success. He died on January 26, 2007.

References
 
 

1936 births
2007 deaths
American country singer-songwriters
Singer-songwriters from Virginia
Country musicians from Virginia
People from Montgomery County, Virginia
20th-century American singers